Violeta Alexandru (born 11 November 1975) is a Romanian politician. She served as Minister of Labour and Social Protection in the first Orban Cabinet led by Prime Minister Ludovic Orban. She also served in the same position in the second Orban Cabinet.

References 

Living people
1975 births
Place of birth missing (living people)
21st-century Romanian politicians
21st-century Romanian women politicians
Romanian Ministers of Labor